Pastrana is a medieval town and municipality in the province of Guadalajara, Castile-La Mancha, Spain,  southeast of the provincial capital, Guadalajara.  It is notable as the site of the imprisonment of the one-eyed Princess of Éboli by Philip II of Spain after a court scandal in 1573, and also as the home since the 17th century of the Pastrana tapestries, a set of four Flemish tapestries depicting the attack of Alfonso V of Portugal on Morocco in 1471.

Geography
Pastrana is centered on a square, La Plaza de la Hora (usually referred to as "La Plaza", in English "the square of the hour"), which is overlooked by the Ducal Palace, the aforementioned Princess' palace and prison rolled into one.  According to legend, she would be allowed to gaze out onto the square from the window of the room she was confined to for one hour a day, whence came the square's name.  Fanning out from La Plaza are narrow, cobbled streets lined with houses, bars and shops.  The main street leads to the Iglesia de la Asunción, in whose museum the tapestries are kept, and also a painting by El Greco.  Further along are the old Jewish and Arab quarters.

Festivals
Important events are Semana Santa at Easter and La Fiesta in August, a week of events, such as concerts, parties, encierros and bullfights, with the town congregating in La Plaza every evening for a night of live music and dancing.

See also

List of municipalities in Guadalajara

External links
A Stranger In Spain by H. V. Morton.  See Chapter III for Morton's travels through Pastrana.

References

Municipalities in the Province of Guadalajara